Tetramethylxylylene diisocyanate (TMXDI) is an organic compound is an organic compound with the formula C6H4(CMe2NCO)2 (Me = CH3).  The molecule features two  isocyanate groups. It was introduced in the 1980s by American Cyanamid. TMXDI is generally classified as an aliphatic isocyanate.  Aliphatic isocyanates generally exhibit enhanced UV stability compared to their aromatic counterparts.

Production
Many isocyanates are produced by phosgenation of amines, but TMXDI is not. It is produced by the reaction of diisopropenylbenzene with hydrogen chloride followed by isocyanic acid:
C6H4(C(Me)=CH2)2  +  2 HCl  →  C6H4(CMe2Cl)2
C6H4(CMe2Cl)2  +  2 HNCO  →  C6H4(CMe2NCO)2  +  2 HCl

Uses 
A key use for TMXDI is in manufacturing polyurethane prepolymers. It is also used to manufacture polyurethane dispersions (PUDs). These materials are then further used to manufacture coatings, adhesives, sealants and elastomers.

TMXDI has been considered as a replacement for Isophorone diisocyanate (IPDI). IPDI has a molecular weight of 222.3 and thus a NCO equivalent weight of 111.15. TMXDI has a molecular weight of 244.3 and thus an equivalent weight of 122.15. Thus per mole, approximately 10% more is required than the equivalent prepolymer based on IPDI. This difference increases cost.When making polyurethanes dispersions (PUDs) TMXDI is advantageous. Being sterically hindered, the NCO groups are slower reacting which is good when dispersing a prepolymer in water to make a PUD. It reduces side reactions and allows more time to allow the dispersion stage before the mix is chain extended. This is done usually with a diamine. It has even found use in a rocket propellant binder by the US military

Safety
Extensive data has become available.

See also 
 Methylene diphenyl diisocyanate
 Toluene diisocyanate
 Isophorone diisocyanate
 Hexamethylene diisocyanate

References

External links 
 Technical Data Sheet TMXDI
 Safety Data Sheet TMXDI
 Incorez website

Isocyanates
Monomers
Alkyl-substituted benzenes